Aktogay is a town located in the Sarysu District, Zhambyl Region, Kazakhstan. It is part of Zhanaaryk rural district (КАТО code — 316037200).

Demographics 
According to the 2009 Kazakhstan census, the town has a population of 781 people. In 1999 the town had a population of 806.

Geography
The town is located in the northern slopes of the Karatau Range by the right bank of the Shabakty river, south of its confluence with the Kyrshabakty, its main tributary.

References

External links
Географическая точка Каньон Шабакты

Populated places in Jambyl Region

ru:Актогай (Жамбылская область)